Jorge Alejandro Salum del Palacio (born 1 September 1962) is a Mexican politician affiliated with the National Action Party. As of 2014, he served as Deputy of the LX Legislature of the Mexican Congress representing Durango.

References

1962 births
Living people
Politicians from Durango
National Action Party (Mexico) politicians
21st-century Mexican politicians
Universidad Juárez del Estado de Durango alumni
Deputies of the LX Legislature of Mexico
Members of the Chamber of Deputies (Mexico) for Durango